Kevin Evans (born 6 June 1978) is a former South African cyclist.

Palmares
2008
1st Stage 5 Tour d'Egypte
3rd National Time Trial Championships
2010
1st  National Time Trial Championships
2nd Giro del Capo

References

1978 births
Living people
South African male cyclists